Mayu Shimizu (清水麻有, born 19 January 1998) is a Japanese rugby sevens player. She competed in the women's tournament at the 2020 Summer Olympics.

References

External links
 

1998 births
Living people
Female rugby sevens players
Olympic rugby sevens players of Japan
Rugby sevens players at the 2020 Summer Olympics
Place of birth missing (living people)
Japan international women's rugby sevens players